The Golden Reel Award for Outstanding Achievement in Sound Editing – Sound Effects, Foley, Music, Dialogue and ADR for Non-Theatrical Feature Film Broadcast Media is an annual award given by the Motion Picture Sound Editors. It honors sound editors whose work has warranted merit in the field of cinema; in this case, their work in the field of non-theatrical film; i.e. films that go direct-to-video or direct-to-streaming. It was first awarded in 1999, for films released the previous year, under the title Best Sound Editing – Direct to Video – Sound. From 1999 until 2011, the award honored both animated and live-action films. The award has been given with its current title since 2018.

Winners and nominees

1990s

2000s

2010s

2020s

External links
Official MPSE Website

References

Golden Reel Awards (Motion Picture Sound Editors)
Special effects awards